This article refers to the National Bank of the Commonwealth of Dominica and not the Dominican Republic.

The National Bank of Dominica is the a major commercial bank in the Commonwealth of Dominica.  The bank was set up in 1978 as a state owned bank and was privatised in 2003.

History
The bank was created by Act No 27 of 1976 by the Parliament of Dominica (under the name National Commercial and Development Bank of Dominica).  The bank officially opened for business on March 15, 1978 with the Agricultural Industrial and Development Bank (AID) bank as a wholly owned subsidiary. 

In January 1982, the AID development bank nank was made a separate and independent entity.  

In 1994, the bank invested in National Commercial Bank of Grenada, jointly, with two other Organisation of Eastern Caribbean States (OECS) indigenous banks to own 12.5% of that bank. An investment in the Caribbean Credit Card Corporation for the issuance and processing of local and international credit cards was also made. Additionally, the Bank acquired shares in the newly privatized Liat (1974) Ltd and East Caribbean Home Mortgage Bank.

By letter dated October 10, 2003, National Commercial Bank of Dominica was advised by the Government of Dominica of its decision to divest itself of its majority holding in the National Commercial Bank (NCB). This was part of Government of Dominica's strategy to privatize NCB. This decision meant that the NCB Act Chapter 74:02 was repealed and a new company, the National Bank of Dominica Ltd was incorporated to succeed the NCB.

References

External links
ECCB Press Release
GRAVITAS press release

Economy of Dominica
Banks of Dominica
Roseau